Adolphe Ambowodé (born 13 February 1958) is an athlete from the Central African Republic. He represented his country at the  1984 and 1988 Summer Olympics.

Achievements
All results regarding marathon, unless stated otherwise

References

External links

1958 births
Living people
Central African Republic male long-distance runners
Olympic athletes of the Central African Republic
Athletes (track and field) at the 1984 Summer Olympics
Athletes (track and field) at the 1988 Summer Olympics
Central African Republic male marathon runners